Tudi Wiggins (October 10, 1935 – July 19, 2006) was a Canadian actress.  She was known for her work in television soap operas

Born Mary Susan Wiggins, in Victoria, British Columbia, she played the roles of Erica Desmond/Helena Raleigh in Strange Paradise (1969–1970), Karen Martin on Guiding Light (1971–1972), Meg Dale on Love of Life (1974–1980), and Sarah Kingsley on All My Children (1981–1982). In 1977 she appeared as a panelist on five episodes of the game show Match Game.

In later years, Wiggins produced, directed, and starred in her own talk show on WTZA-TV in Kingston, New York.

In 1989, she retired from the entertainment industry and moved to Fowler, New York.

During her retirement, in the nearby  Gouverneur, New York, area, she became a caregiver to the elderly and infirm with Health Services of Northern New York and the Community Development Program.

Mary Susan "Tudi" Wiggins died of cancer Wednesday, July 19, 2006, at E.J. Noble Hospital, Gouverneur, New York. She was 70. She never married.

Filmography

Film

Television

References

External links
 

Canadian soap opera actresses
Canadian television actresses
Canadian emigrants to the United States
1935 births
2006 deaths
Deaths from cancer in New York (state)
Actresses from Victoria, British Columbia
People from Kingston, New York
People from Gouverneur, New York